The following is a list of ecoregions in Venezuela as identified by the World Wide Fund for Nature (WWF).

Terrestrial
Venezuela is in the Neotropical realm. Ecoregions are listed by biome.

Tropical and subtropical moist broadleaf forests
 Catatumbo moist forests
 Cordillera de la Costa montane forests
 Cordillera Oriental montane forests
 Guayanan Highlands moist forests
 Guianan moist forests
 Guianan piedmont and lowland moist forests
 Japurá–Solimões–Negro moist forests
 Negro–Branco moist forests
 Orinoco Delta swamp forests
 Tepuis
 Venezuelan Andes montane forests

Tropical and subtropical dry broadleaf forests
 Apure–Villavicencio dry forests
 Lara–Falcón dry forests
 Maracaibo dry forests

Tropical and subtropical grasslands, savannas, and shrublands
 Guianan savanna
 Llanos

Flooded grasslands and savannas
 Orinoco wetlands

Montane grasslands and shrublands
 Cordillera de Merida páramo

Deserts and xeric shrublands
 Araya and Paria xeric scrub
 Guajira–Barranquilla xeric scrub
 La Costa xeric shrublands
 Paraguana xeric scrub

Mangroves
 Coastal Venezuelan mangroves
 Guianan mangroves

Marine

Tropical Atlantic
 Guianian
 Southern Caribbean

References

 
ecoregions
Venezuela